Dorothy A. Leonard (born 1942) is an American professor of business administration specialized in knowledge management. She is the William J. Abernathy professor of business administration emerita at the Harvard Business School.

Education 
Leonard completed a Ph.D. at Stanford University.

Career 
Leonard worked in Southeast Asia for ten years. She taught at the MIT Sloan School of Management for three years. In 1983, Leonard joined the Harvard Business School. She researches knowledge management for innovation and methods of increasing creativity in groups.

Personal life 
Leonard was married to management consultant Ronald B. Barton. Barton died September 19, 1995.

Selected works

References 

Living people
Place of birth missing (living people)
1942 births
20th-century American businesswomen
20th-century American businesspeople
21st-century American businesswomen
21st-century American businesspeople
Stanford University alumni
MIT Sloan School of Management faculty
Harvard Business School faculty
20th-century American women writers
21st-century American women writers
American women academics